Abel Andres Nuñez Valdez (born November 25, 1987) is a former Argentine footballer.

Valdez played in the Paraguayan top division with Club Fernando de la Mora in 2006, scoring a goal in Mora's 4–3 victory over 3 de Febrero. After Mora's relegation, Valdez transferred to Club 12 de Octubre.

Valdez signed with Romania's Astra Ploieşti for three years in 2009. He debuted as a substitute on 21 August 2009. He caught swine flu while with Astra in November 2009 and finished his career on loan to the reserves.

External links
 Abel Valdez at bdfa.com

References

1987 births
Living people
Argentine footballers
Association football defenders
FC Delta Dobrogea Tulcea players
FC Astra Giurgiu players
Liga I players
Expatriate footballers in Romania
People from Formosa, Argentina